Bogolyubka is a rural locality (a village) in Novoalexandrovskoye Rural Settlement, Suzdalsky District, Vladimir Oblast, Russia. The population was 98 as of 2010. There are 2 streets.

Geography 
Bogolyubka  is located on the Rpen River, 36 km south of Suzdal (the district's administrative centre) by road. Sushchevo is the nearest rural locality.

References 

Rural localities in Suzdalsky District